The Santer-Poos I Ministry was the government of Luxembourg between 20 July 1984 and 14 July 1989.  It was the first of three led by Prime Minister Jacques Santer.  Throughout the ministry, the Deputy Prime Minister was Jacques Poos.

It was formed following the general election of 1984. It represented a coalition between Santer's Christian Social People's Party (CSV) and Poos' Luxembourg Socialist Workers' Party (LSAP), which had been elected the largest and second-largest parties in the legislature.

Background 
In the election of 17 June 1984, the number of seats had been raised from 59 to 64. The Democratic Party lost one seat compared with the previous election, while the CSV gained one, even though its share of the vote fell slightly. The LSAP made large gains, winning 21 seats. Partly, this was because the left-wing vote was no longer split between the LSAP and the Social Democratic Party. The socialists had campaigned against the austerity policy of the previous government. The elections of 1984 saw a green party campaigning for the first time, the Green Alternative Party, which received two seats.

With the previous prime minister Pierre Werner retiring from political life, Jacques Santer was now charged with forming a government, and his CSV entered into coalition with the CSV. This coalition was to last for three legislative periods.

Foreign policy 
The Santer-Poos government was active in the project of European integration, while attempting to safeguard Luxembourg's interests. For six months from 1 July 1985, Luxembourg held the presidency of the European Community.

During this period, important decisions were taken to drive forward to process of European integration. At the European Council of Milan, on 28–29 June 1985, the foundations were laid for the future Single European Act, which aimed to dismantle internal barriers between the member states of the European Community and introduce the free circulation of goods, capital and services.

Apart from Europe, developing countries became an important target of Luxembourg's foreign policy. From 1984, the secretary of state for foreign trade and cooperation, Robert Goebbels, presented three bills which organised Luxembourgish development aid in a coherent manner, created the Fund for Development Cooperation (Fonds de la coopération au développement), regulated state subsidies to Luxembourgish non-governmental organisations, and introduced new fiscal measures to encourage philanthropy.

Economic policy 
The structural crisis in the steel industry remained a major problem for the government's economic policy, even though the crisis was starting to lessen. As matters were generally starting to evolve in a more positive direction, the government started to ease up slightly on the austerity policy that had been in place since the start of the crisis. The laws of 24 December 1984, and of 30 June 1986, widened the system of automatic indexation of salaries and wages.

The Santer-Poos government continued with the "niche" policy of its predecessors. The decline of the steel industry was compensated by the promotion of new industries. The legal environment put in place by the state was favourable to the development of the finance and media sectors. In 1985, the Société Européenne des Satellites (SES) was created, on the basis of a concession from the Luxembourgish state. The government gave the SES a state guarantee, in order to allow the financing of the Astra system of satellites. After having had some success in the domain of television broadcasts by satellite, the authorities tried to support audiovisual production. The law of 13 December 1988 introduced certificates of audiovisual investment, which gave their owners considerable tax allowances. In the course of the same year, the government adapted existing legislation to a 1985 European Directive concerning the legal framework on Undertakings for Collective Investment in Transferable Securities. This adaptation gave a new impetus to the investment fund sector.

Social policy 
In social policy, the government pursued a policy aimed at reinforcing national solidarity. It proceeded to increase family allowances and pensions. One major novelty was the introduction of a guaranteed minimum income.

Ministers

References

Ministries of Luxembourg
History of Luxembourg (1945–present)
1984 establishments in Luxembourg
1989 disestablishments in Luxembourg
Cabinets established in 1984
Cabinets disestablished in 1989